The 31st Buil Film Awards ceremony is hosted by the Busan-based daily newspaper Busan Ilbo. It was held on October 6, 2022 at the Signiel Busan Grand Ballroom in Haeundae-gu, Busan. In the 31st edition, awards will be presented in 16 categories for 215 Korean films that were released from August 11, 2021 to August 10, 2022. Kim Nam-gil and Choi Soo-young will host the award show.

Judging panel
The judging panel consisted of 9 members: 
 Nam Dong-cheol: Busan International Film Festival chief programmer 
 Park Ki-yong: Film Promotion Committee Chairman 
 Yoo Ji-na: film critic, professor of Film and Digital Media at Dongguk University 
 Lee Moo-young: film director, professor of Film and Video at Dongseo University
 Lee Joo-hyun: Busan Ilbo Culture Department Deputy Director
 Lee Joo-hyun: Cine21 editor
 Jeon Chan-il: film critic, chairman of the Korean Cultural Content Critics Association 
 Jeong Min-ah: film critic, professor of Theatre and Film at Sungkyul University
 Hong Ji-young: film director - New Year Blues

Awards and nominations 
Nominees and winners (winners denoted in bold)

See also 
 58th Baeksang Arts Awards
 58th Grand Bell Awards
 43rd Blue Dragon Film Awards
 27th Chunsa Film Art Awards

References

External links 
  
 30th Buil Film Awards at Daum 

Asian Film Awards ceremonies
Buil Film Awards
Buil
Annual events in South Korea
2022 in South Korean cinema